Krodhi is a 1981 Indian Hindi-language action thriller film was directed by Subhash Ghai and it stars huge cast such as, Dharmendra, Shashi Kapoor, Zeenat Aman, Hema Malini, Premnath, Pran in pivotal roles. Kalyanji-Anandji's background score extensively used in Mahabharata of BR Chopra.

Summary 
Vikramjit Singh (Dharmendra), alias Vicky, is an orphan who grows up amidst hatred and poverty. One day, however, a local school teacher, Shakarbaba, sees him studying from far and brings him into his school. Soon, Vicky becomes friend with a young girl named Aarti, and they fall in love. Vicky educates himself goes to study abroad. He keeps in touch with Aarti, and they grow up in love with each other. On the day Vicky decides to propose for marriage to Aarti, she is sold by her lecherous uncle for a few thousand rupees, to a group of men who attempt to rape her, but she kills herself. Enraged by this, Vicky hunts down her uncle, and her molesters and kills them by throwing them from a high-rise building. Vicky's anger prompts him to more daredevil deeds, and he ends up becoming the ultimate underworld don with a private army of his own. Then one of his associates, Neera, marries CBI Officer Kumar Sahni, and Vicky is on the run, and believed to be dead when his bullet-proof helicopter crashes. Years later, Neera comes to visit her in-laws in a small town, and is introduced to a kind and saintly person with special powers for healing named Shradhanand. She is shocked to find that Shradhanand is none other than Vicky. Now Vicky will have to decide whether to run again, or kill this only witness, and continue living without any trouble for the rest of his life.

Cast 
Dharmendra as Vikramjeet Singh "Vicky" / Acharya Shradhanand
Shashi Kapoor as CBI Officer Kumar Sahni
Zeenat Aman as Neera Sahni
Hema Malini as Phoolmati
Sachin as Raja
Ranjeeta as Guddi
Premnath as Jagira
Pran as Acharya
Moushumi Chatterjee as Aarti
Amrish Puri as Madhvan
Bharat Bhushan as Muktanand
Krishan Dhawan as Jagannath
A. K. Hangal as Mr. Sahni
Sulochana Latkar as Mrs. Sahni 
Iftekhar as Police Commissioner
Jagdish Raj as Police Inspector
Sudhir Dalvi as Shankar Baba
Sudhir as Dilawar
Mac Mohan as Mac
Raj Mehra as Benjamin
Sajjan as Dr. David
Surendra Pal as Victor
Asit Sen as Daroga Sharma
P. Jairaj as Denanath
Birbal as Chamcham
Brahmachari as Panwala
Raju Shrestha as Master Krishna
C. S. Dubey as Aarti's Uncle
D. K. Sapru as Zamindar
Vimi as Madhavan's Mistress

Soundtrack 
Lyrics: Anand Bakshi

References

External links 
 

1980s Hindi-language films
1981 films
Films directed by Subhash Ghai
Films scored by Laxmikant–Pyarelal